Palaeocoprina is a genus of flies belonging to the family Sphaeroceridae, the lesser dung flies.

Species
P. argentinensis Marshall, 1998
P. colombiensis Marshall, 1998
P. disticha (Becker, 1920)
P. equiseta Marshall, 1998
P. geminiseta (Duda, 1920)
P. longinotum Marshall, 1998
P. masneri Marshall, 1998
P. pisinna Marshall, 1998
P. quadriseta Marshall, 1998

References

 

Sphaeroceridae
Diptera of South America
Taxa named by Oswald Duda
Brachycera genera